Kevyn William Adams (born October 8, 1974) is an American former professional ice hockey center and current general manager of the Buffalo Sabres of the National Hockey League. During his career, Adams played for the Toronto Maple Leafs, Columbus Blue Jackets, Florida Panthers, Carolina Hurricanes, Phoenix Coyotes and the Chicago Blackhawks, and was also a former associate coach for the Sabres.

Playing career 
Adams grew up in Clarence, New York and played his youth hockey for the Wheatfield Blades organization at a rink then known as Sabreland, where the Buffalo Sabres used to practice. Adams played collegiately for Miami University and was drafted in the 1st round, 25th overall by the Boston Bruins in the 1993 NHL Entry Draft. Adams has also played for the Florida Panthers, Columbus Blue Jackets, and Toronto Maple Leafs. His best season was 2000–01 when he had 29 points. The Carolina Hurricanes acquired Adams, Bret Hedican, and Tomas Malec on January 16, 2002 from the Panthers for Sandis Ozolinsh and Byron Ritchie. During the NHL lockout season in 2004–05, Adams played a short stint for the DEG Metro Stars in Düsseldorf, Germany. With the return of the NHL in 2005–06, he returned to Carolina, where he was an alternate captain on the Hurricanes Stanley Cup winning team that season. On January 8, 2007, he was traded to the Phoenix Coyotes for Dennis Seidenberg. On August 11, 2007, Adams was traded to the Chicago Blackhawks for Radim Vrbata. On October 7, 2008, Adams was released from the Blackhawks. On January 6, 2009, Adams retired to become a player-agent.

Coaching and management career 
On August 3, 2011, Adams was named Assistant Coach of the Buffalo Sabres.  He was fired on May 9, 2013, two days after the Sabres named Ron Rolston as their new head coach. Adams was named the Senior Vice President of Business Administration for the Sabres in 2019. On June 16, 2020, he was named the team's general manager, replacing the recently-fired Jason Botterill.

On March 25, 2021, Adams filled in as head coach of the Sabres when head coach Don Granato and assistant coach Matt Ellis entered the NHL's COVID protocol. The Sabres lost the game, 4-0, against the Pittsburgh Penguins, extending the Sabres winless streak to sixteen games.

Personal life 
Adams was the second player in NHL history, after Bill Nyrop, to be born in the District of Columbia. Despite being born in the D.C. area, Adams grew up in Clarence, New York, and keeps a second home in Bemus Point, New York.  He was inducted into the Miami University Athletics Hall of Fame in 2011.

Career statistics

Regular season and playoffs

International

Awards and honors

References

External links 

Kevyn Adams Day With the Stanley Cup
Miami Hockey 2005–06 Media Guide

1974 births
Living people
American expatriate ice hockey players in Canada
American men's ice hockey centers
Boston Bruins draft picks
Buffalo Sabres coaches
Carolina Hurricanes players
Chicago Blackhawks players
Columbus Blue Jackets players
DEG Metro Stars players
Florida Panthers players
Grand Rapids Griffins (IHL) players
Ice hockey people from New York (state)
Ice hockey people from Washington, D.C.
Miami RedHawks men's ice hockey players
National Hockey League first-round draft picks
People from Clarence, New York
Phoenix Coyotes players
St. John's Maple Leafs players
Stanley Cup champions
Toronto Maple Leafs players
Ice hockey players from New York (state)